Alice L. MacGowan (December 10, 1858 – March 10, 1947) was an American writer. She and her sister Grace wrote over 30 novels, about a hundred short stories, and some poetry. Alice produced several best sellers, including Two by Two, that was serialized in the Saturday Evening Post and was published in 1922 in New York under the title The Million Dollar Suitcase.

Early years
She was born in Perrysburg, Ohio, the daughter of John Encil MacGowan and Malvina Marie Johnson. The family moved to Chattanooga, Tennessee, where her sister Grace was born. Alice was educated in public schools in addition to being home schooled by her father, a Colonel with the Union Army during the American Civil War and editor of the Chattanooga Times from 1872–1903. 

Grace married William Benjamin Cooke on February 16, 1887 in Hamilton, Tennessee. They had two children, Helen and Katherine (or "Kit"). Harry Leon Wilson married Helen Cooke in 1912. They had two children and divorced in 1927.

Alice was living with her sister at Upton Sinclair's Helicon Home Colony in 1907 when it burned to the ground. Both were taken to Englewood Hospital to recover.

Career
Alice became a writer of short stories and novels, while collaborating with her sister Grace on most of her works. Together they would write over 30 novels, about a hundred short stories, and some poetry. The subject matter of their writings included Westerns, mysteries, historical novels, and social novels. Briefly married to a much older man, Alice lived in Texas working as a governess.

In December 1908, the MacGowan sisters, with Helen and Katherine, and their mother moved to the semi-remote colony of artists and literati at Carmel-by-the-Sea, California, which included such influential figures as Mary Hunter Austin, Jack London, Upton Sinclair, George Sterling, Francis McComas, Xavier Martinez, Sinclair Lewis, and Nora May French. The sisters moved into a large, two-story house on 13th Avenue, northeast of San Antonio Street, built in 1905 by arhitect Eugenia Maybury.

The sisters apparently avoided the more lascivious activities of this Bohemian enclave because a satirical commentator from the Los Angeles Times placed Alice and Grace in the "social faction" known as the "Eminently Respectables".  As if to reinforce this image the Times described a 1911 Carmel Christmas party where Jack London, the MacGowan sisters, and the “diminutive dog” Fluffy Ruffles sat at the same table eating lady fingers.  Alice actively supported various local charities as well as the Carmel Arts and Crafts Club, and fought the removal of village trees, the paving of the quaint gravel streets and all “encroachments ... of an advancing civilization.”  

The two sisters stopped writing together around 1910. Alice collaborated with Garnet Holme on a dramatization of her novel The Sword in the Mountains, titled Chattanooga. Grace wrote the children's book, Son Riley Rabbit and Little Girl (1908) with her daughter Kit posing for the book's illustrations. She wrote The Power and the Glory (1910), a novel set in Appalachia. 

In May 1914, just two months before the start of the highly publicized William Merritt Chase summer school of art in Carmel, the San Francisco press and the New York Times reported that Alice had been intentionally poisoned at her home.  The respected Carmel artist Jennie V. Cannon recounted that there had been several previous attempts to murder Alice, who “was popular with everybody.” The perpetrators were never caught.

Carmel proved to be a writer's paradise and Alice produced several best sellers.  She co-authored five detective stories with the one-time mayor of Carmel, Perry Newberry (see Bibliography below).  Their runaway success, “Two by Two”, was serialized in the Saturday Evening Post and was published in 1922 by Stokes in New York under the title “The Million Dollar Suitcase.”  In April 1922 she lectured with Newberry on the "thriller in literature" at Paul Elder's Gallery in San Francisco.

 

Alice and Grace resumed collaboration with The Straight Road (1917) and The Trail of the Little Wagon (1928). But the sisters novels became less popular during the Great Depression, and in 1935 they sold their house in Carmel and moved to Los Gatos, California with Grace's daughter, Katherine. Alice died there in 1947 at age 89.

Selected works

 The Last Word (1903)
 Return
 Judith of the Cumberlands (1908)
 Wiving of Lance Cleaverage (1909)
 The Sword in the Mountains (1910)
 The Million-dollar Suitcase (1922) with Perry Newberry
 A Girl of the Plains Country (1924)
 The Mystery Woman (1924) with Perry Newberry
 Shaken Down (1925) with Perry Newberry
 The Seventh Passenger (1926)
 Who Is This Man? (1927) with Perry Newberry

References

External links

 
 
 
 
  (previous page of browse report under 'MacGowan, Alice, 1858-' without '1944')
 Grace MacGowan Cooke at LC Authorities, with 18 records, and at WorldCat
 Perry Newberry at LC Authorities, with 9 records, and at WorldCat

1858 births
1947 deaths
20th-century American novelists
American women novelists
People from Perrysburg, Ohio
People from Chattanooga, Tennessee
Novelists from Ohio
Novelists from Tennessee
20th-century American women writers
People from Carmel-by-the-Sea, California
People from Los Gatos, California
Novelists from California